The 1980 City of Glasgow District Council election  took place on 1 May 1980, alongside elections to the councils of Scotland's various other districts. This was the third election to the City of Glasgow District Council.

Background
The previous election, held in 1977, had seen Labour lose its majority on the council and while the party still had the largest number of councillors (30), the Labour group decided not to try retain power after rejecting the possibility of coalition deals with either the Conservatives or the SNP. This left the second placed Conservatives to form a minority administration, although they also refused to work with the SNP and prior to the first meeting of the council after the election it  was uncertain what would happen. Ultimately the Council met on 9 May 1977, SNP abstentions meant that Labour's nominee David Hodge was elected Lord Provost of Glasgow over the Conservatives Jack Richmond. Although the Conservatives had said that they would only form an administration if Richmond  was elected as Lord Provost, after an internal vote among the Conservative group they decided that they would form an administration after all. However it was noted in The Glasgow Herald that many of the Conservatives policies, including the sale of council houses, were unlikely to be supported by the majority on the council.

Ultimately, lacking support from other parties, the Conservative administration announced it would relinquish power in September 1979 after the Council rejected its plan to cut spending by up to £30 million pounds, paving the way for Labour to form a minority administration. According to The Glasgow Herald the political uncertainty since the 1977 election meant "Glasgow District Council has gained an unenviable reputation for chaos and outrageous behaviour among its members."

By the time of the election as a result of by-elections and other changes Labour held 32 seats to the Conservatives 22, the SNP's 14 and the Liberal Party's one. There were two independent councillors and one seat was vacant. Ahead of the election, the Herald reported that Labour were confident of success, with the party hopeful of gaining up to 20 seats, which would give them a large majority.

Outcome
Labour won a decisive victory gaining 26 seats to give them a 44 seat majority over all other parties. The SNP lost all of their seats while the Conservatives lost 11 of the 22 seats they held. The Liberals gained two seats (one from the Conservatives and one from the SNP). The Glasgow Herald observed the result was even more spectacular for Labour than had been predicted and attributed this to voters wishing to see an end to "the City Chambers comedy show" of the last few years. It also attibuted the Labour gains from the Conservatives, which were reflected in other parts of Scotland, as a result of the unpopularity of Margaret Thatcher's government, which had been in power for one year.

Several prominent Conservative and SNP councillors lost their seats including the SNP's Stewart Ewing, who had in 1977 defeated the Labour group leader, and the Conservative former housing convener Derek Wood.

Aggregate results

Ward results

References

1980
1980 Scottish local elections
1980s in Glasgow